The Commonwealth Foundation is an intergovernmental organisation based in the UK.

Commonwealth Foundation may also refer to:

 Commonwealth Foundation for Public Policy Alternatives in Pennsylvania, U.S.

See also
Commonwealth of Nations
Commonwealth Fund
Commonwealth Games Federation
Commonwealth Institute